Helmut Bantz (14 September 1921 – 4 October 2004) was a German gymnast and Olympic champion. He won a gold medal in the vault at the 1956 Summer Olympics in Melbourne, competing for the United Team of Germany.

Having fought for Germany in World War II, Bantz was captured by the British forces in 1944 and taken to England. After he had been released from the status of prisoner-of-war in 1948 he stayed in England to find a job in agriculture. A couple of months later, Bantz acted as the unofficial coach of the British men's gymnastic team during the 1948 Summer Olympics in London. Among those he coached were Frank Turner and George Weedon.

He then returned to Germany and competed in all artistic gymnastics events at the 1952 and 1956 Olympics. He won two silver and one bronze medals at the 1954 World Artistic Gymnastics Championships, as well as a four medals at the 1955 European Men's Artistic Gymnastics Championships. After retirement he worked as a gymnastics coach in Cologne. He married Erika; they had two daughters, Sabine and Susanne, and a son, Rainer. Since the 1980s he suffered from health problems, and had a heart attack in 1981, back surgery in 1984, and leg amputation due to circulatory disorders in 1994, followed by another leg amputation. He died in 2004 after a long illness.

References

External links

1921 births
2004 deaths
German male artistic gymnasts
Olympic gymnasts of Germany
Olympic gymnasts of the United Team of Germany
Olympic gold medalists for the United Team of Germany
Olympic medalists in gymnastics
Medalists at the 1956 Summer Olympics
Gymnasts at the 1952 Summer Olympics
Gymnasts at the 1956 Summer Olympics
People from Speyer
People from Rhenish Hesse
Medalists at the World Artistic Gymnastics Championships
German military personnel of World War II
German prisoners of war in World War II held by the United Kingdom
European champions in gymnastics
German expatriate sportspeople in the United Kingdom
Sportspeople from Rhineland-Palatinate
20th-century German people
21st-century German people